Pedro Urbina Montoya, O.F.M. or Pedro de Urbina y Montoya (12 August 1585 – 6 February 1663) was a Roman Catholic prelate who served as Archbishop of Seville (1658–1663), Archbishop of Valencia (1648–1658), and Bishop of Coria (1644–1648).

Biography
Pedro Urbina Montoya was born in Berantevilla, Spain on 12 August 1585 and ordained a priest in the Order of Friars Minor on 22 February 1609. On 2 May 1644, he was appointed during the papacy of Pope Urban VIII as Bishop of Coria. On 11 September 1644, he was consecrated bishop by Diego Arce Reinoso, Bishop of Plasencia, with Miguel Avellán, Titular Bishop of Siriensis, and Timoteo Pérez Vargas, Titular Bishop of Lystra, serving as co-consecrators. On 30 December 1648, he was selected by the King of Spain and confirmed by Pope Innocent X on 28 June 1649 as Archbishop of Valencia. He was installed on 18 December 1649. On 1 April 1658, he was appointed during the papacy of Pope Alexander VII as Archbishop of Seville. He served as Archbishop of Seville until his death on 6 February 1663.

Episcopal succession
While bishop, he was the principal consecrator of:
Luis Crespi y Borja, Bishop of Orihuela (1652);
 
and the principal co-consecrator of:
Juan Juániz de Echalar, Bishop of Mondoñedo (1645); 
Domenico Blanditi, Bishop of Umbriatico (1650); 
Tommaso Lolli, Titular Bishop of Cyrene (1650); and
Giovanni Gerini, Bishop of Volterra (1650).

References

External links and additional sources
 (for Chronology of Bishops) 
 (for Chronology of Bishops) 
 (for Chronology of Bishops)
 (for Chronology of Bishops)
 (for Chronology of Bishops) 
 (for Chronology of Bishops) 

17th-century Roman Catholic bishops in Spain
Bishops appointed by Pope Urban VIII
Bishops appointed by Pope Innocent X
Bishops appointed by Pope Alexander VII
1585 births
1663 deaths
People from Álava
Franciscan bishops